Ruská Bystrá is a village and municipality in the Sobrance District in the Košice Region of east Slovakia.

History
In historical records the village was first mentioned in 1405. There is a Church of St. Nicholas in Ruská Bystrá built at the beginning of the 18th century which has just 2 towers and the shape of its almost perfect geometric roof resembles traditional houses of peasants. Interior with religious artefacts dates back to the 18th century as well.

Geography
The village lies at an altitude of 453 metres and covers an area of 11.965 km².
It has a population of 130 people.

Facilities
The village has a public library

External links
 
http://www.statistics.sk/mosmis/eng/run.html
http://en.e-obce.sk/obec/ruskabystra/ruska-bystra.html

Villages and municipalities in Sobrance District